Bossiaea prostrata, commonly known as creeping bossiaea, is a prostrate understory shrub  in the pea family, Fabaceae. It is a widespread species with orange-yellow flowers, purple-brown keels and trailing branches.

Description
The stems are flattened toward the apex and either smooth or with short flattened or spreading hairs. Flowering occurs between September and November in its native range.
It is similar to the species Bossiaea buxifolia, but may be distinguished by its longer leaves, petioles and pedicels and more distant leaf spacing.

Taxonomy and naming
Bossiaea prostrata was first formally described in 1812 by botanist Robert Brown and the description was published in Hortus Kewensis. The specific epithet (prostrata) is a Latin word meaning "down flat", "overthrown" or "laid low",

Distribution and habitat
Creeping bossiaea occurs in South Australia, Victoria, Tasmania, New South Wales and Queensland in Australia. It grows in coastal heath, grassland and open-forest on a variety of soils including clay-shale, preferring wetter locations.

References

prostrata
Mirbelioids
Flora of New South Wales
Flora of Queensland
Flora of South Australia
Flora of Tasmania
Flora of Victoria (Australia)
Taxa named by Robert Brown (botanist, born 1773)